Young Knight in a Landscape, or Portrait of a Knight, is an oil on canvas painting by the Italian Renaissance artist Vittore Carpaccio, now in the Thyssen-Bornemisza Collection in Madrid. Dated 1510, this is the earliest full-length portrait in Western painting—on the assumption that it is a portrait, as it seems likely. It is characteristic of Carpaccio that apart from this important innovation, the style of the work seems in other respects to look back to the previous century. From some time until the 20th century the painting had been given the monogram of Albrecht Dürer, and Carpaccio's signature had been overpainted. The realism and detail of Carpaccio does in fact show Northern influence.

Composition
The painting shows a young knight, surrounded by a rather crowded series of symbols.  The heron caught in the sky by a hawk might hint at this knight's death in battle, also alluded to by his posture, which recalls that of a funerary statue; an alternative theory is that this is a memorial portrait of a person already dead.  The other knight with a lance might then be the same person during his life.  Alternatively, the figure on horseback might be his page; the page of a knight occasionally appears in portraits wearing his master's helmet and having his gauntlets on his person, ready to supply both when called upon, which seems to have been an actual practice.  Two later examples are Titian's portrait of Alphonso D'Avalos, and a portrait by Paris Bordone of a man in armour with two pages (now Metropolitan Museum of Art, New York). In the left lower corner is a white ermine and a scroll stating "I prefer to die rather than to incur dishonour" (malo mori quam foedari).  The symbolism of these and the other animals and plants have been much discussed by art historians.

Subject identity
For centuries the identity of the knight has been a subject of discussion among the most renowned art historians, including Bernard Berenson and Lionello Venturi. The portrait is now considered most likely to show Francesco Maria I della Rovere, the Duke of Urbino and nephew of Pope Julius II, during whose reign it was painted.  Nevertheless, a more recent interpretation identifies the knight as the Venetian patrician Marco Gabriel, who was rector of the fortress of Methoni, in Greece, during the Ottoman siege of 1500. His family would have commissioned the painting as a tribute to his memory, as, being the only Venetian survivor of the siege, he had been accused of cowardice. Taken by the Ottomans to Constantinople, he was beheaded there on 4 November 1501.

Owners
The painting was sold by the heirs of the American collector Otto Kahn after his death and bought by Heinrich Thyssen in 1935.

Details

References

External links

Thyssen Collection
Video Museo Thyssen-Bornemisza: Young Knight in a Landscape

1510 paintings
Paintings by Vittore Carpaccio
16th-century portraits
Paintings in the Thyssen-Bornemisza Museum
Horses in art
Birds in art
Dogs in art